Mikla is a contemporary restaurant in Istanbul, known for its "New Anatolian Kitchens". Opened in October 2005, Mikla is on the top two floors of The Marmara Pera Hotel located in the historical Pera region, with its view of Istanbul.

Restaurant
Mikla opened in October 2005. The initial idea was to create a refined but contemporary "Istanbullu" restaurant. Both the menu and the general feel of the restaurant reflect the Turkish-Scandinavian background of Mehmet Gürs, the Chef-Owner who was among the pioneer of the contemporary restaurant scene in Istanbul when he moved to Istanbul in 1996.

The name of the restaurant is derived from "Miklagard", the Old Norse name for Istanbul, meaning "the Great Town".

Food
Mikla launched its "New Anatolian Kitchen" in 2012.

Location
Located on the roof top floor of "The Marmara Pera" hotel.

Chef-Owner
The restaurant's owner and chef Mehmet Gürs was born in Finland to a Turkish father and a Finnish-Swedish mother. Grown up in Sweden, completed his hospitality education and proper training in USA and settled in Istanbul in 1996 to open up his first restaurant. Currently he is the chef-owner of the Food and Beverage Group in Bangladesh.

References

External links
 Official site

Restaurants in Istanbul
Restaurants established in 2005
Scandinavian restaurants
2005 establishments in Turkey
Beyoğlu